Witten Hauptbahnhof is a railway station in the town of Witten in western Germany. It is situated southwest of the town.

In 1849 the station was opened as Witten West by the Bergisch-Märkische Eisenbahn-Gesellschaft. At the end of the 19th century the whole station was reconstructed, the new station building was designed by the architect Richard Witten Sauerbruch and opened in 1901. It is now part of The Industrial Heritage Trail. In 1940 the station was renamed Witten Hauptbahnhof.

History 
Witten station was originally built as part of the Elberfeld–Dortmund trunk line of the Bergisch-Märkische Railway Company, which was opened on 20 December 1848, originally only for freight. On 26 October 1860, the BME began building its Ruhr route from this station.

Deutsche Reichsbahn opened a freight rail line through Witten-Höhe to Wengern Ost connecting with the Ruhr Valley Railway on 4 October 1926. In Witten-Höhe, the Witten–Wengern Ost/Schwelm railway branched off  from 15 May 1934 to 30 November 1979, carrying passenger trains to Gevelsberg West and Schwelm. This line was permanently closed at the beginning of 1983. Passenger services continued through Wengern Ost to Hagen-Vorhalle for three years, but were also closed on 1 June 1986.

Current situation 
The section of the Elberfeld–Dortmund line to the south is used by both long distance and regional services, the section of the line to the north has, however, only been used by Rhine-Ruhr S-Bahn line S 5 since 1988.

The regional services stop in the station on the Witten/Dortmund–Oberhausen/Duisburg line to Essen Hauptbahnhof. Since 1988, long-distance services have run without stopping in Witten on the same route as well as on the faster line built via the Oberstraße Tunnel to Dortmund Hauptbahnhof.

The only lines still in operation on the south bank of the Ruhr (Witten Hbf to Witten-Höhe, Witten-Höhe to Wengern Ost, Wengern Ost to Hagen-Vorhalle) are now connected together as  a through freight route.

The tram lines 309 and 310 stops nearby Witten Hbf at the stop Witten Bahnhofstraße. The new line 309 runs between Heven Dorf and Bochum-Langendreer S.

The bus junction is served by the express bus route SB38 (Ennepetal - Gevelsberg - Wetter - Witten - Hattingen) and city bus lines 320, 371, 375, 376, 379 and 592. At night (weekend) the junction is also served by the night buses NE17 and NE18. All cities closed-by Witten can be reached.

References

External links

Railway stations in North Rhine-Westphalia
Rhine-Ruhr S-Bahn stations
Railway stations in Germany opened in 1849
Hauptbahnhof
S5 (Rhine-Ruhr S-Bahn)
1849 establishments in Prussia